Telephone numbers in Monaco are eight digits in length, with fixed line numbers beginning with the digit 9 and mobile phone numbers with the digit 6.

Overview 
Until 21 June 1996, Monaco formed part of the French numbering plan, with fixed line numbers beginning with 93. On that date the Principality adopted its own country code +377. Consequently, all calls between France and Monaco had to be dialled in international format, including those to and from surrounding areas in France.   
  
From Monaco to France 
00 33 x xx xx xx xx

From France to Monaco
00 377 xx xx xx xx

Mobile phone operators in at least two other jurisdictions, specifically Lonestar Cell in Liberia and Vala in Kosovo, have also used the +377 dialing code. Vala's use of +377 ceased on 3 February 2017, when Kosovo implemented the +383 code.

See also
 Telecommunications in Monaco

References

External links
Monaco – World Telephone Numbering Guide
ITU number plan for +377

Monaco
Communications in Monaco